José Jesús Mesas Puerta (born 24 December 1968), known as Mesas, is a Spanish retired footballer who played as a defender, and currently works as a football agent.

Playing career
Mesas began his career with amateur sides in his Madrid, including CD Los Yébenes San Bruno, CD Campamento and CD Puerta Bonita before joining Real Madrid's C-team in 1989. Having not broken into the Real Madrid first team, he left for fellow Spanish side CD Leganés, where he spent six years, playing semi-professionally in Segunda División B and Segunda División whilst also working part-time in a bank.

Mesas turned professional after joining Sporting de Gijón, playing as a first team regular in his first season, before being pushed out by the emergence of Isma Piñera and Yago Alonso. He left for Scottish side Dundee in 2000, but did not have a major impact.

Mesas returned to Spain to finish his career with lower league sides Lorca CF and Real Ávila CF, before retiring at the end of the 2002–2003 season.

Agent career
After retiring, Mesas became a football agent. He has his own agency and also works for the Real Federación Española de Fútbol. He has represented players such as Jesús Navas, Ayoze García, Rubén Suárez and, before his retirement, Sergio Fernández. He is also close friends with Cameroonian footballer Samuel Eto'o.

References

External links

1968 births
Living people
People from Madrid
Spanish footballers
Footballers from the Community of Madrid
Association football defenders
Segunda División players
Segunda División B players
Tercera División players
Real Madrid C footballers
CD Leganés players
Sporting de Gijón players
Dundee F.C. players
Spanish expatriate footballers
Spanish expatriate sportspeople in Scotland
Expatriate footballers in Scotland